is a railway station in the city of Yokote, Akita Prefecture,  Japan, operated by JR East.

Lines

Station layout
The station consists of a single side platform serving bi-directional traffic. A waiting room is located at the center of the platform. The station is unattended.

History
Komatsukawa Station opened on December 25, 1951 as a station on the Japan National Railways (JNR). The station was absorbed into the JR East network upon the privatization of the JNR on April 1, 1987.

Surrounding area

See also
List of railway stations in Japan

References

External links

 JR East Station information 

Railway stations in Japan opened in 1951
Railway stations in Akita Prefecture
Kitakami Line
Yokote, Akita